North Willingham is a village and civil parish in the West Lindsey district of Lincolnshire, England. The population of the civil parish (including Sixhills) was 181 at the 2011 census.

The village is listed in the 1086 Domesday Book as "Wunlingeha", with 57 households.

The parish church is dedicated to Saint Thomas the Apostle and is a Grade II listed building dating from the 14th century, with later additions and alterations and an 1896 interior restoration. It contains a 19th-century octagonal font. Built into the west wall of the nave is the head of a 13th-century grave slab, and in the chancel two freestanding crosses brought from Palestine after the First World War.

St Thomas became part of Walesby Group of Parishes in 1979, which comprises churches in Brookenby, Claxby by Normanby, Kirmond le Mire, Normanby le Wold, Stainton le Vale, Tealby and Walesby.

North Willingham Church of England School was built in 1850 and closed in 1949.

Jessie Boucherett was a campaigner for women's rights. Daughter of Ayscough (sometimes Ayscoghe) Boucherett, High Sheriff of Lincolnshire, she was born at Willingham House in 1825 and died there in 1905, being buried at St Thomas church. The house was built in 1790 for the Boucherett family.

During the Second World War Willingham House became Camp 256, a Prisoner of War work camp. It held German prisoners who worked as labourers in the local area. Willingham House was demolished in 1976.

References

External links

Villages in Lincolnshire
Civil parishes in Lincolnshire
West Lindsey District